Smote Reverser is the twenty-first studio album by American garage rock band Oh Sees, released on August 17, 2018, on Castle Face Records. The album features keyboardist Tomas Dolas, who contributed to 2017's Memory of a Cut Off Head, and subsequently joined the band as a full time member.

Critical reception
{{Album ratings
| MC         = 79/100
| rev1       = The 405| rev1score  = 6.5/10
| rev2       = AllMusic
| rev2Score  = 
| rev3       = The A.V. Club| rev3Score  = B+
| rev4       = Clash| rev4score  = 8/10
| rev5       = Drowned in Sound| rev5score  = 8/10
| rev6       = The Line of Best Fit| rev6score  = 8/10
| rev7       = NME| rev7score  = 
| rev8       = Paste| rev8score  = 8.5/10
| rev9       = Pitchfork| rev9Score  = 7.6/10
| rev10      = Rolling Stone| rev10score = 
}}Smote Reverser'' was met with "generally favorable" reviews from critics. At Metacritic, which assigns a weighted average rating out of 100 to reviews from mainstream publications, this release received an average score of 79, based on 18 reviews. Aggregator Album of the Year gave the release a 75 out of 100 based on a critical consensus of 18 reviews.

Track listing

Personnel
Credits adapted from AllMusic.

Oh Sees
John Dwyer – effects, guitar, hand percussion, Mellotron, synthesizer, vocals, Wurlitzer electric piano
Tim Hellman – bass
Dan Rincon – drums
Paul Quattrone – drums, timbales

Additional musicians
Brigid Dawson – backing vocals 
Tomas Dolas – B3 organ, Mellotron, Wurlitzer electric piano
Heather Locke – sampled viola on "The Last Peace"

Technical personnel
Matt Stawicki – cover artwork
Eric Bauer – engineering, mixing, production 
Enrique Tena – engineering, mixing, production
JJ Golden – mastering
Matthew Jones – layout
Brian Lee Hughes – additional photography

Charts

References

2018 albums
Oh Sees albums
Castle Face Records albums